The following is a list of mayors of the city of Brazzaville, Republic of the Congo. The Republic of the Congo became independent of French colonial rule in 1960.

 Fulbert Youlou (1956)
 Dominique Nzalakanda (1956-1959)
 Simon Bilondo (1956-1961)
 Joseph Senso (1961-1963)
 Jean-Louis Mamimoué (1963-1965)
 Hervé Joseph Mayordome (1965-1969)
 Lambert Galibali (1969-1974)
 Pascal Ockyemba Morlende (1974-1977)
 Louis Zatonga (1977-1979)
 André Obami Itou (1979)
 Gabriel Emouengue (1979-1984)
 Jean Jules Okabando (1984-1991)
 Gabriel Obongui (1991-1992)
 Clément Mampouya (1992-1993)
 Raymond Alain Bakou (1993-1994)
 André Bakala (1994)
 Bernard Kolélas (1994-1997)
 Dévoué B. Boukaka Ouadiabantou (1997)
 Aimé Emmanuel Yoka (1997-1999)
 Benoit Moundélé-Ngolo (1999-2003)
 Hugues Ngouelondélé (2003-2017)
 Christian Roger Okemba, since 24 August 2017

See also
 Timeline of Brazzaville

References

 
Brazzaville
Lists of Republic of the Congo people
Brazzaville
Republic of the Congo politics-related lists